Oscar Reynert Olsen (born 23 May 1925) is a Norwegian illustrator, painter, graphical artist and lecturer. He was born in Stavanger, and studied at the Norwegian National Academy of Craft and Art Industry and at the Norwegian National Academy of Fine Arts. From 1952 to 1958 he worked as illustrator for the newspaper Arbeiderbladet. Among his book illustrations are woodcuts for the novel series Nattens brød by Johan Falkberget. He was appointed as lecturer at the Norwegian National Academy of Craft and Art Industry. He is represented at the National Gallery of Norway, Riksgalleriet and other art galleries.

References

1925 births
Living people
People from Stavanger
Norwegian illustrators